Félix Augusto Antonio Ulloa Garay (born 6 April 1951) is a Salvadoran politician and lawyer who became Vice President of El Salvador on 1 June 2019.

Biography

Early life 
Ulloa was born in Chinameca, San Miguel Department, on 6 April 1951. He is the son of Margarita Garay and Félix Ulloa. He graduated from high school in San Miguel, at the catholic Maristas Brothers. His father became known as the “Rector Martyr University of El Salvador”, after losing his life in an attack perpetrated by paramilitaries in 1980.

Education and Legal Career 
Ulloa obtained his law degree from the Complutense University of Madrid, Spain in 1979, and received his PhD in Law cum laude. He completed postgraduate studies in Public Policy and Public Administration at the International Institute of Public Administration in Paris, France, and at the Hubert H. Humphrey Institute of Public Affairs of the University of Minnesota, United States. He also completed a postgraduate degree in Banking and Finance at the Technological University of El Salvador (UTEC).

Félix Ulloa actively participated in the university student movement, being president of the Student Electoral Tribunal of the General Association of Salvadoran University Students (AGEUS). As a lawyer, he was a member of the Legal Aid of the Externado San José, leader of the Workers Union of the Salvadoran Institute of Social Security, and later of the National Union of Salvadoran Workers. During the Salvadorian Civil War, he created the Institute of Legal Studies of El Salvador (ILSEL) with several other lawyers. He has been president of the ILSEL on several occasions.

His experience and academic qualifications enabled him to be a professor of Political Science in the PhD program in Social Sciences at the University of El Salvador. Ulloa also taught various law courses at the Central American University. He was a visiting professor for several years at the Spanish School of Middlebury College in Vermont, and a guest speaker at multiple universities in the Americas.

Early Political Career 
After the civil war, Ulloa was elected Magistrate of the first Supreme Electoral Tribunal of El Salvador from 1994 to 1999. He also joined the Board of Surveillance of Political Parties from 1993 to 1994 and the Special Sub-Commission of the CO-PAZ. He was an editor of the Electoral Code during 1992 and 1993. He was part of the Political Commission of the National Revolutionary Movement Party, of which his father was founder, which is affiliated with the Socialist International.

Constitutional Reform 

Ulloa presented constitutional amendments against laws that he believed supported an anti-democratic Electoral System and were impairing the ability for democracy to take hold. These are constitutional resolutions that substantially changed the electoral system, a product of the demands of unconstitutionality presented by Ulloa along with other Salvadoran jurists. Ulloa passed several amendments, including
 Elimination of the "National List", issued on 26 July 2010 by the Constitutional Chamber, which prevents senior political leaders from perpetuating themselves in the legislative branch.
 Vote for face (photography was allowed and meet the deputy representing the citizen).
 Vote crossed (vote for several deputies and even from different political parties).
 Residential vote (the citizen and the militants who defend the vote can only vote in their municipality).
 Independent Deputies (citizens without party militancy are allowed to opt for the Legislative Assembly).

Presidential Run 

Following an invitation from Nayib Bukele to accompany him in the presidential formula of the Grand Alliance for National Unity (GANA), consisting of the political parties GANA - CD and New Ideas; Ulloa, ran for Vice-President. Winning the elections of 3 February 2019, he became the Vice President-elect of the Republic and took office on 1 June 2019 alongside President-elect Nayib Bukele.

Vice Presidential Term 
President Nayib Bukele appointed Ulloa to lead Central American Integration and the International Commission Against Impunity of El Salvador, which has the goal of combating corruption and impunity, inside and outside the State. He is in charge of leading the Trifinio Plan, a trinational treaty that involves the vice-presidents of Guatemala, Honduras and El Salvador, to improve the living conditions of border communities and to develop a process of environmental and territory management.

Personal life 
He married psychologist Lilian Alvarenga de Ulloa in 1973, and has three children.

Publications 
Ulloa has published academic articles in the United States, Mexico, Spain, France, Chile, Haiti, the Dominican Republic and in every country in Central America. Among them are articles entitled:
 Money and democracy
 Politics, state and society; Democratic thinking
 The role of political parties in Central American institutions
 The Salvadoran electoral system, 25 years after the signing of the Peace Agreements
 The utopia continues
 Haiti: 200 years of Elections and Constitutions
 La Crise de la Démocratie Représentative
 Le Systéme Électoral des États-Unis

References

1951 births
Living people
People from San Miguel Department (El Salvador)
20th-century Salvadoran lawyers
Vice presidents of El Salvador
21st-century Salvadoran lawyers